Cypress Springs High School, CSHS, or more commonly as Cy-Springs  is located at 7909 Fry Road, in Cypress, an unincorporated community in Harris County, Texas.

Cypress Springs High School was established in 1997, making it the sixth high school within Cypress Fairbanks Independent School District to open its doors to students in the Cypress and Katy areas. Since 2015, the school's principal has been Dr. Cheryl T. Henry. From 2012-2015, the school's principal was Travis Fanning and from 2008-2012, the school's principal was Barbara Weiman, one of the former Associate Principals before her promotion. Prior to Mrs. Weiman becoming principal, Sarah Harty was principal, until she was chosen to be the first principal of nearby Cypress Lakes High School which opened in 2008. The first principal to serve was Alan Meek, who helped establish the school in 1997.

Cypress Springs has many school clubs held before and after school for its students to participate in, such as Creative Writing Club, Chess Club, Key Club, Tech Club, Art Club, French Club, Spanish Club, Photography Club, Science Olympiad, Sociedad Honoraria Hispanica (Spanish National Honorary Society), InvenTeam, Drama Club, and Dungeons and Dragons (D&D) Club.

History
The school first opened in 1997, becoming the sixth school in CFISD. The graduating class of 2008 was Cypress Springs' largest senior class with more than 1,000 students walking the stage at the Richard E. Berry Educational Support Center to receive their diplomas.

In the 2005-2006 school year, attendance at this high school reached more than 4,000 students due to the building boom taking place in the local area, making for a crowded school and crowded hallways.

In 2016 a wave of CFISD high school rezoning occurred. Cypress Park High School opened, taking a portion of the Cypress Springs zone. In addition another portion of the Cypress Springs zone was given to Cypress Lakes High School. In turn, a section of the Langham Creek High School attendance zone was reassigned to Cypress Springs High School.

Academics
For the 2018-2019 school year, the school received a B grade from the Texas Education Agency, with an overall score of 83 out of 100. The school received a B grade in two domains, Student Achievement (score of 82) and School Progress (score of 86), and a C grade in Closing the Gaps (score of 77). The school received two of the seven possible distinction designations for Academic Achievement in English Language Arts/Reading and Post-Secondary Readiness.

Demographics 
The demographic breakdown of the 2,626 students enrolled for 2021-22 was:

 African American: 31.7%
 Hispanic: 51.1%
 White: 7.4%
 Native American: 0.4%
 Asian: 6.1%
 Pacific Islander: 0.2%

In the school year 2021-2022, 64.6% of students are economically disadvantaged.

Feeder patterns

Schools that feed into Cypress Springs include:
Elementary schools: André, Duryea, Copeland (partial), Hemmenway (partial), Jowell (partial), McFee (partial), Postma (partial), Rennell (partial), Walker (partial)
Middle schools: Hopper (partial), Anthony (partial), Kahla (partial)

Notable alumni
 Cat Osterman - Olympic Gold Medalist in Women's Softball
 Erica Enders - NHRA Pro Stock Driver
 Courtney Enders - NHRA Super Stock Driver
 Phillip McDonald - Professional Basketball Player
 Lawson Craddock - Pro Track and Road Racing Cyclist
 Kimberlyn Duncan - 2013 American 200m Champion Track & Field
 Derrick Lewis - UFC fighter

References

External links
Cypress Springs High School
 and schools.cy-fair.isd.tenet.edu/cysprings/index.htm

Cypress-Fairbanks Independent School District high schools
1997 establishments in Texas
Educational institutions established in 1997